Sasan castle is a historical castle in Qazvin County, Qazvin Province, Iran. The origin of this fortress dates back to the historical periods after Islam.

References 

Castles in Iran